Talia    is a municipality in Baalbek District, 73 kilometers from Beirut. Its elevation is 1030 meters above sea level.

The population is mostly Greek Orthodox Christian.

References

Populated places in Baalbek District

Eastern Orthodox Christian communities in Lebanon